Polycarpa is a genus of ascidian tunicates in the family Styelidae.

Species within the genus Polycarpa include:

 Polycarpa aernbaeckae Monniot, 1964 
 Polycarpa albatrossi (Van Name, 1912) 
 Polycarpa albopunctata (Sluiter, 1904) 
 Polycarpa ambonensis (Sluiter, 1904) 
 Polycarpa appropinquata (Sluiter, 1898) 
 Polycarpa arenosa Monniot & Monniot, 1976 
 Polycarpa argentata (Sluiter, 1890) 
 Polycarpa arnbackae Monniot F., 1964 
 Polycarpa arnoldi (Michaelsen, 1914) 
 Polycarpa aspera (Herdman, 1886) 
 Polycarpa astromarginata Monniot & Monniot, 2003 
 Polycarpa aurata (Quoy & Gaimard, 1834) 
 Polycarpa aurita (Sluiter, 1890) 
 Polycarpa beuziti Monniot, 1970 
 Polycarpa biforis (Sluiter, 1904) 
 Polycarpa biscayensis Monniot C. & Monniot F., 1974 
 Polycarpa camptos Monniot & Monniot, 2001 
 Polycarpa captiosa (Sluiter, 1885) 
 Polycarpa carpocincta Monniot & Monniot, 2003 
 Polycarpa cartilaginea (Sluiter, 1898) 
 Polycarpa caudata Monniot C. & Monniot F., 1974 
 Polycarpa chinensis (Tokioka, 1967) 
 Polycarpa clavata Hartmeyer, 1919 
 Polycarpa colletti Herdman, 1906 
 Polycarpa comata (Alder, 1863) 
 Polycarpa conchilega (Fleming, 1822) 
 Polycarpa contecta (Sluiter, 1904) 
 Polycarpa cornogi Glemarec & Monniot, 1966 
 Polycarpa cryptocarpa (Sluiter, 1885) 
 Polycarpa cylindrocarpa Tokioka, 1970 
 Polycarpa decipiens Herdman, 1906 
 Polycarpa delta Monniot & Monniot, 1968 
 Polycarpa directa Kott, 1990 
 Polycarpa discoidea Heller, 1877 
 Polycarpa distomaphila Millar, 1953 
 Polycarpa divisa (Ostroumov & Pavlenko, 1911) 
 Polycarpa ecuadorensis Millar, 1988 
 Polycarpa ehrenbergi Hartmeyer, 1916 
 Polycarpa errans Hartmeyer, 1909 
 Polycarpa fibrosa (Stimpson, 1852) 
 Polycarpa flava Kott, 1985 
 Polycarpa foresti Monniot, 1970 
 Polycarpa fungiformis Herdman, 1898 
 Polycarpa glebosa (Sluiter, 1904) 
 Polycarpa goreensis (Michaelsen, 1914) 
 Polycarpa gracilis Heller, 1877 
 Polycarpa gradata Monniot, 2002 
 Polycarpa granosa Tokioka, 1953 
 Polycarpa hartmeyeri Michaelsen, 1927 
 Polycarpa inchacae Monniot & Monniot, 1976 
 Polycarpa indiana Monniot & Monniot, 1985 
 Polycarpa inhacae Monniot & Monniot, 1976 
 Polycarpa insulsa (Sluiter, 1898) 
 Polycarpa intonata Kott, 1985 
 Polycarpa irregularis Herdman, 1881 
 Polycarpa itapoa Rocha & Moreno, 2000 
 Polycarpa itera Monniot C. & Monniot F., 1977 
 Polycarpa kapala Kott, 1990 
 Polycarpa kornogi Glémarec & Monniot C., 1966 
 Polycarpa longicarpa Tokioka, 1952 
 Polycarpa longiformis Tokioka, 1952 
 Polycarpa longitubis Monniot, Monniot & Leung Tack, 1987 
 Polycarpa macra Monniot & Monniot, 1991 
 Polycarpa maculata Hartmeyer, 1906 
 Polycarpa madagascariensis (Michaelsen, 1912) 
 Polycarpa mamillaris (Gaertner, 1774) 
 Polycarpa maruhi Monniot & Monniot, 1987 
 Polycarpa melanosiphonica Tokioka, 1967 
 Polycarpa minuta Herdman, 1881 
 Polycarpa molguloides Herdman, 1882 
 Polycarpa muelleri Brunetti, 2007 
 Polycarpa multiplicata Monniot, 1983 
 Polycarpa mytiligera (Savigny, 1816) 
 Polycarpa natalensis (Sluiter, 1898) 
 Polycarpa nigerrima Monniot & Monniot, 2001 
 Polycarpa nigricans Heller, 1878 
 Polycarpa nota Kott, 1985 
 Polycarpa obscura Heller, 1878 
 Polycarpa offa Monniot C. & Monniot F., 1988 
 Polycarpa olitoria (Sluiter, 1890) 
 Polycarpa ovata Pizon, 1908 
 Polycarpa palaonensis Tokioka, 1950 
 Polycarpa palinorosa (Sluiter, 1895) 
 Polycarpa palkensis Herdman, 1906 
 Polycarpa papillata Sluiter, 1885 
 Polycarpa papyra Kott, 1985 
 Polycarpa patens (Sluiter, 1885) 
 Polycarpa pedunculata Heller, 1878 
 Polycarpa pegasis Michaelsen, 1922 
 Polycarpa pentarhiza Monniot F., 1965 
 Polycarpa perstellata Monniot & Monniot, 2003 
 Polycarpa pigmentata (Herdman, 1906) 
 Polycarpa plantei Monniot, 2002 
 Polycarpa plenovata Kott, 1985 
 Polycarpa pomaria (Savigny, 1816) 
 Polycarpa porculus Monniot C. & Monniot F., 1979 
 Polycarpa pori Monniot, 2002 
 Polycarpa procera (Sluiter, 1885) 
 Polycarpa producta Monniot & Monniot, 2003 
 Polycarpa psammodes (Sluiter, 1904) 
 Polycarpa psammotesta Tokioka, 1953 
 Polycarpa pseudoalbatrossi Monniot C. & Monniot F., 1968 
 Polycarpa pulvinum Monniot, 1969 
 Polycarpa pusilla (Herdman, 1884) 
 Polycarpa pustulosa (Sluiter, 1904) 
 Polycarpa quadricarpa Millar, 1953 
 Polycarpa reniformis (Sluiter, 1904) 
 Polycarpa reviviscens Monniot & Monniot, 2001 
 Polycarpa richeri Monniot, 1987 
 Polycarpa rigida Herdman, 1881 
 Polycarpa rima Monniot & Monniot, 1996 
 Polycarpa rockallensis Millar, 1982 
 Polycarpa rubida (Sluiter, 1898) 
 Polycarpa scuba Monniot C., 1971 
 Polycarpa seges Kott, 2009 
 Polycarpa simplex Tokioka, 1950 
 Polycarpa simplicigona Millar, 1975 
 Polycarpa sobria (Sluiter, 1904) 
 Polycarpa sourieri Peres, 1949 
 Polycarpa spiralis (Sluiter, 1885) 
 Polycarpa spongiabilis Traustedt, 1883 
 Polycarpa stirpes Kott, 1985 
 Polycarpa suesana Michaelsen, 1919 
 Polycarpa takarazima Tokioka, 1954 
 Polycarpa tenera Lacaze-Duthiers & Delage, 1892 
 Polycarpa thelyphanes (Sluiter, 1904) 
 Polycarpa tinctor (Quoy & Gaimard, 1834) 
 Polycarpa tinctorella Kott, 1985 
 Polycarpa tokiokai Monniot & Monniot, 1996 
 Polycarpa translucida (Peres, 1951) 
 Polycarpa triruga Monniot & Monniot, 2003 
 Polycarpa tumida Heller, 1878 
 Polycarpa twynami Herdman, 1906 
 Polycarpa urmeli Sanamyan & Hissmann, 2008 
 Polycarpa vankampeni Sluiter, 1919 
 Polycarpa violacea (Alder, 1863) 
 Polycarpa viridis Herdman, 1880 
 Polycarpa willisi Herdman, 1906 
 Polycarpa zeteta Millar, 1982 

Species names currently considered to be synonyms:

 Polycarpa abjornseni Michaelsen, 1927: synonym of Polyandrocarpa abjornseni (Michaelsen, 1928) 
 Polycarpa anguinea (Sluiter, 1898): synonym of Polyandrocarpa anguinea (Sluiter, 1898) 
 Polycarpa attollens Herdman, 1899: synonym of Polycarpa papillata Sluiter, 1885 
 Polycarpa bassi Herdman, 1886: synonym of Polycarpa obscura Heller, 1878 
 Polycarpa capricornia Kott, 1952: synonym of Polycarpa papillata Sluiter, 1885 
 Polycarpa circumarata (Sluiter, 1904): synonym of Polycarpa aurita (Sluiter, 1890) 
 Polycarpa coccus Michaelsen, 1919: synonym of Eusynstyela miniata (Sluiter, 1905) 
 Polycarpa crossogonima Millar, 1962: synonym of Polycarpa arnoldi (Michaelsen, 1914) 
 Polycarpa curta Herdman, 1884: synonym of Polycarpa comata (Alder, 1863) 
 Polycarpa doderleini Hartmeyer, 1906: synonym of Polycarpa procera (Sluiter, 1885) 
 Polycarpa doderleinii Hartmeyer, 1906: synonym of Polycarpa procera (Sluiter, 1885) 
 Polycarpa doederleini Hartmeyer, 1906: synonym of Polycarpa procera (Sluiter, 1885) 
 Polycarpa elata Heller, 1878: synonym of Polycarpa papillata Sluiter, 1885 
 Polycarpa erecta Pizon, 1908: synonym of Polycarpa nigricans Heller, 1878 
 Polycarpa finmarckiensis : synonym of Cnemidocarpa finmarkiensis (Kiaer, 1893) 
 Polycarpa finmarkiensis Kiaer, 1893: synonym of Cnemidocarpa finmarkiensis (Kiaer, 1893) 
 Polycarpa formosa Herdman, 1884: synonym of Polycarpa comata (Alder, 1863) 
 Polycarpa fristedti Michaelsen, 1923: synonym of Polycarpa procera (Sluiter, 1885) 
 Polycarpa informis (Forbes, 1848): synonym of Polycarpa pomaria (Savigny, 1816) 
 Polycarpa intermedia Hartmeyer, 1919: synonym of Polycarpa papillata Sluiter, 1885 
 Polycarpa intestinata Kott, 1952: synonym of Polycarpa papillata Sluiter, 1885 
 Polycarpa iwayamae Tokioka, 1950: synonym of Polycarpa argentata (Sluiter, 1890) 
 Polycarpa libera Kiaer, 1893: synonym of Polycarpa comata (Alder, 1863) 
 Polycarpa longisiphonica Herdman, 1881: synonym of Polycarpa rigida Herdman, 1881 
 Polycarpa lucilla Kott, 1985: synonym of Polycarpa hartmeyeri Michaelsen, 1927 
 Polycarpa marchadi Monniot, 1969: synonym of Polycarpa goreensis (Michaelsen, 1914) 
 Polycarpa marioni Peres, 1951: synonym of Polycarpa goreensis (Michaelsen, 1914) 
 Polycarpa mayeri Traustedt, 1883: synonym of Polycarpa pomaria (Savigny, 1816) 
 Polycarpa miniata (Sluiter, 1905): synonym of Eusynstyela miniata (Sluiter, 1905) 
 Polycarpa moebii Michaelsen, 1905: synonym of Polycarpa viridis Herdman, 1880 
 Polycarpa monoceros (Moeller, 1842): synonym of Styela rustica Linnaeus, 1767 
 Polycarpa multiphiala Verrill, 1900: synonym of Polycarpa spongiabilis Traustedt, 1883 
 Polycarpa mutilans Herdman, 1906: synonym of Polycarpa papillata Sluiter, 1885 
 Polycarpa nivosa (Sluiter, 1898): synonym of Polycarpa anguinea (Sluiter, 1898) 
 Polycarpa obtecta Traustedt, 1883: synonym of Polycarpa spongiabilis Traustedt, 1883 
 Polycarpa palinorsa (Sluiter, 1895): synonym of Polycarpa palinorosa (Sluiter, 1895) 
 Polycarpa pedata Herdman, 1881: synonym of Cnemidocarpa pedata (Herdman, 1881) 
 Polycarpa picteti Pizon, 1908: synonym of Polycarpa pigmentata (Herdman, 1906) 
 Polycarpa pilella Herdman, 1881: synonym of Polyandrocarpa pilella (Herdman, 1881) 
 Polycarpa polyphlebodes Hartmeyer, 1919: synonym of Polycarpa aurita (Sluiter, 1890) 
 Polycarpa quadrata Herdman, 1881: synonym of Cnemidocarpa quadrata (Herdman, 1881) 
 Polycarpa radicata Herdman, 1881: synonym of Polycarpa pedunculata Heller, 1878 
 Polycarpa rugosa Drasche, 1884: synonym of Polycarpa spongiabilis Traustedt, 1883 
 Polycarpa rustica (Linnaeus, 1767): synonym of Styela rustica Linnaeus, 1767 
 Polycarpa sabulosa Heller, 1877: synonym of Polycarpa gracilis Heller, 1877 
 Polycarpa seriata Michaelsen, 1905: synonym of Polycarpa olitoria (Sluiter, 1890) 
 Polycarpa seychellensis (Michaelsen, 1912): synonym of Polycarpa mytiligera (Savigny, 1816) 
 Polycarpa sigmilineata Millar, 1975: synonym of Polycarpa decipiens Herdman, 1906 
 Polycarpa sluiteri Herdman, 1899: synonym of Polycarpa rigida Herdman, 1881 
 Polycarpa solvens (Sluiter, 1895): synonym of Polycarpa olitoria (Sluiter, 1890) 
 Polycarpa steindachneri Michaelsen, 1919: synonym of Eusynstyela miniata (Sluiter, 1905) 
 Polycarpa sulcata Herdman, 1882: synonym of Polycarpa aurata (Quoy & Gaimard, 1834) 
 Polycarpa thelypanes (Sluiter, 1904): synonym of Polycarpa thelyphanes (Sluiter, 1904) 
 Polycarpa unilineata Kott, 1952: synonym of Polycarpa obscura Heller, 1878 
 Polycarpa varians Heller, 1877: synonym of Polycarpa pomaria (Savigny, 1816)

References

Stolidobranchia
Tunicate genera